Juan Carlos Macías (born April 28, 1945) is an Argentine film editor. He is sometimes credited as: Juan C. Macías.

Some of the films he has edited have been critically well received: The Official Story (1985), Old Gringo (1989), and Kamchatka (2002).

Filmography (partial)
 La Historia oficial (1985) a.k.a. The Official Story
 Abierto de 18 a 24 (1988)
 Old Gringo (1989)
 Cenizas del paraíso (1997)
 Spoils of War (2000)
 Plata Quemada (2000) Burnt Money
 La Fuga (2001) a.k.a. The Escape
 Micaela, una película mágica (2002)
 Kamchatka (2002)
 Ciudad del sol (2003)
 Noite de São João (2003)
 Cleopatra (2003)
 Un Día en el paraíso (2003)
 Vivir Intentando (2003)
 Memoria del saqueo (2004) a.k.a. Social Genocide
 La Dignidad de los nadies (2005) a.k.a. The Dignity of the Nobodies
 El Cobrador: In God We Trust (2006)
 Hacer patria (2006)

References

External links
 
 

1945 births
Argentine film editors
Living people
Place of birth missing (living people)